Hoi Bun Road Park is a public park in Kwun Tong, Kowloon, Hong Kong.

As of 2019–20, the park is closed for demolition and reconstruction.

History
The 9,300 square metre park was built at a cost of $18.8 million for the enjoyment of the working population in the Kwun Tong industrial estate. It was designed by the local architecture firm Spence Robinson and was opened in 1990 by the Urban Council.

Features
 5-a-side football pitch
 pavilion with table tennis tables
 stepped planter with look-off
 Chinese chess tables
 toilets

See also
 Kwun Tong Promenade – a nearby park with a similar Chinese name
 List of urban public parks and gardens in Hong Kong

References

External links
 

Kwun Tong
Urban public parks and gardens in Hong Kong